Manushyan is a 1979 Indian Malayalam film,  directed by P. Ravindran. The film stars Madhu, Kuthiravattam Pappu and Vidhubala in the lead roles. The film has musical score by V. Dakshinamoorthy.

Cast
Madhu
Kuthiravattam Pappu
Vidhubala

Soundtrack
The music was composed by V. Dakshinamoorthy and the lyrics were written by Bharanikkavu Sivakumar and O. N. V. Kurup.

References

External links
 

1979 films
1970s Malayalam-language films